Tirana consists of 24 administrative units.

Administrative division

Below are the original 11 municipal units of Tirana that were in effect until 2015. These were joined by 13 more divisions effective June 2015 following the 2015 Administrative-Territorial Division Reform of Albania totaling 24 administrative units for Tirana:

Urban Tirana

Rural Tirana

Following the 2015 Administrative-Territorial Division Reform, 13 new rural administrative units were added to the new Municipality of Tirana. The new divisions and their corresponding villages are as follows:

Petrelë
Petrelë, Mullet, Stërmas, Picall, Shënkoll, Gurrë e Madhe, Gurrë e Vogel, Daias, Barbas, Fikas, Mangull, Qeha, Shytaj, Hekal, Kryezi, Percëllesh, Durishtë
Farkë
Farkë e Madhe, Farkë e Vogël, Lundër, Mjull Bathore, Sauk, Selitë
Dajt
Linzë, Shishtufinë, Tujan, Brrar, Ferraj, Priskë e Madhe, Surrel, Lanabreges, Shkallë, Qafmollë, Darshen, Selbë, Murth
Zall-Bastar
 Zall-Bastar, Bastar i Mesëm, Bastar – Murriz, Vilëz, Zall-Mner, Mner i Sipërm, Bulçesh, Zall Dajt, Besh, Dajt, Shëngjin i Vogël, Selitë Mali
Bërzhitë
Ibë, Bërzhitë, Dobresh, Ibë e Poshtme, Pëllumbas, Mihajas-Cirmë, Kus, Fravesh, Kllojkë, Pashkashesh, Lugë-Shalqizë, Rozaverë
Krrabë
Krrabë, Fshatrat; Mushqeta, Skuterë
Baldushk
 Baldushk, Mumajes, Fushas, Balshaban, Shpatë, Isufmuçaj, Mustafakoçaj, Koçaj, Kakunj, Vesqi, Parret, Shënkoll, Vrap, Shpat i Sipërm
Shëngjergj
 Shëngjergj, Verri, Urë, Burimas, Shëngjin, Façesh, Bizë, Fage, Parpujë, Vakumone, Domje, Derje
Vaqarr
 Vaqarr, Allgjatë, Arbanë, Bulticë, Damjan-Fortuzaj, Gropaj, Lalm, Prush, Vishaj, Sharrë
Kashar
Kashar, Yzberish, Mëzez, Yrshek, Katundi i Ri, Kus, Mazrek
Pezë
Pezë e Madhe, Pezë Helmës, Pezë e Vogël, Varosh, Maknor, Dorëz, Gror, Grecë, Pajanë, Gjysylkanë
Ndroq
Fshatrat; Ndroq, Zbarqe, Kërçukje, Zhurje, Lagje e Re, Pinet, Sauqet, Çalabërzezë, Shesh, Grebllesh, Mënik
Zall-Herr
Zall - Herr, Dritas, Çerkezë-Morinë, Qinam, Kallmet, Herraj, Pinar, Priskë e Vogël, Radhesh

See also 
Neighborhoods of Tirana

References